Korytnica  is a village in Węgrów County, Masovian Voivodeship, in east-central Poland. It is the seat of the gmina (administrative district) called Gmina Korytnica.

The village has a population of 860.

References

Villages in Węgrów County